Dugesia arcadia is a species of freshwater dugesiid found in northern Peloponnese, Greece.

The specific name "arcadia" refers to the district Arcadia, on the Peloponnese.

References

arcadia
Animals described in 1988